No Business Creek is a stream located in Morgan County, Alabama. A tributary of Flint Creek, it runs near the town of Hartselle.

References 

Rivers of Morgan County, Alabama